Linford Wood is a  Local Nature Reserve in East Tilbury in Essex. It is owned and managed by Thurrock Council.

The site has mixed woodland, a willow plantation, hedges, ditches and an open area. Birds include tawny owls, great spotted woodpeckers and green woodpeckers. It is part of the proposed extended Thurrock Thameside Nature Park.

There is access from East Tilbury Road.

References

Local Nature Reserves in Essex
 Thurrock